USC&GS Mitchell was a launch that served as a survey ship in the United States Coast and Geodetic Survey from 1919 to 1944.

Mitchell was built by the Canton Lumber Company at Baltimore, Maryland, in 1919.  She entered Coast and Geodetic Survey service that year.

On 10–11 December 1924, Mitchell and the Coast and Geodetic Survey launch USC&GS Marindin aided a United States Marine Corps  motor sailer that had gone aground by pulling it off the rocks and towing it to the U.S. Marine Corps boathouse at St. Thomas in the United States Virgin Islands.

Mitchell was retired from Coast and Geodetic Survey service in 1944.

References
NOAA History, A Science Odyssey: Tools of the Trade: Ships: Coast and Geodetic Survey Ships: Mitchell
NOAA History, A Science Odyssey: Hall of Honor: Lifesaving and the Protection of Property by the Coast & Geodetic Survey 1845-1937

Ships of the United States Coast and Geodetic Survey
Survey ships of the United States
Ships built in Baltimore
1919 ships